Marian Kurowski (born 15 February 1949) is a Polish football manager.

References

1949 births
Living people
Polish football managers
Amica Wronki managers
Lech Poznań managers
Odra Opole managers
People from Szamotuły